The 1985 du Maurier Classic was contested from July 25–28 at Beaconsfield Golf Club. It was the 13th edition of the du Maurier Classic, and the seventh edition as a major championship on the LPGA Tour.

This event was won by Pat Bradley.

Final leaderboard

External links
 Golf Observer source

Canadian Women's Open
du Maurier Classic
du Maurier Classic
du Maurier Classic
du Maurier Classic